Thelymitra media, commonly called the tall sun orchid, is a species of orchid that is endemic to eastern Australia. It has a single fleshy, channelled leaf and up to thirty blue flowers with darker streaks but without spots. The labellum (the lowest petal) is narrower than the other petals and sepals.

Description
The lobe on the top of the anther is short with a dark collar, yellow tip and a few short, finger-like glands on its back. The side lobes project forwards and have white, mop-like tufts on their ends. The flowers are insect-pollinated and open on warm sunny days. Flowering occurs from October to January.

This sun orchid is similar to T. ixioides but is larger and has unspotted flowers.

Taxonomy and naming
Thelymitra media was first formally described in 1810 by Robert Brown and the description was published in Prodromus Florae Novae Hollandiae et Insulae Van Diemen. The specific epithet (media) is a Latin word meaning "middle".

Distribution and habitat
The tall sun orchid grows in high rainfall forest in south eastern New South Wales and eastern Victoria.

References

media
Endemic orchids of Australia
Orchids of New South Wales
Orchids of Victoria (Australia)
Plants described in 1810
Taxa named by Robert Brown (botanist, born 1773)